Sir Angus James Bruce Ogilvy  (14 September 1928 – 26 December 2004) was a British businessman. He is best known as the husband of Princess Alexandra of Kent, a first cousin of Queen Elizabeth II. Ogilvy is also remembered for his role in a business scandal, known as the Lonrho affair, involving the breaking of sanctions against Rhodesia during the 1970s. In later years, he was very involved in charity work.

Early life
He was born in London as the second son of the 12th Earl of Airlie and Lady Alexandra Coke, daughter of the 3rd Earl of Leicester. Many of his relatives had close links with the British royal family.

His grandmother, Mabell Ogilvy, Countess of Airlie, was a close friend and lady-in-waiting to Queen Mary. His father was a lord-in-waiting to George V and Lord Chamberlain to Queen Elizabeth (later the Queen Mother). He was a second cousin of Diana Mitford, a second cousin of Lavinia Fitzalan-Howard, Duchess of Norfolk, and a second cousin once removed of Robert Gascoyne-Cecil, 5th Marquess of Salisbury.

Education and career
Ogilvy was educated at Heatherdown School, near Ascot in Berkshire, and later at Eton College (also in Berkshire). Between 1946 and 1948, while on National service, he was commissioned as an officer in the Scots Guards. In 1947, he attended Trinity College, Oxford, graduating in 1950 with a BA in Philosophy, Politics, and Economics (PPE).

After university, Ogilvy worked at the Drayton company and later worked with the tycoon Tiny Rowland at Drayton's subsidiary, London and Rhodesia Mining and Land Company (Lonrho). The then-Prime Minister, Sir Edward Heath, criticised the company and described it in the House of Commons as "an unpleasant and unacceptable face of capitalism" on a 1973 court case over the company's management style. Ogilvy's business career ended in 1976, after he was criticised in a Department of Trade report into the company's activities.

Marriage

On 24 April 1963, Ogilvy married Princess Alexandra of Kent, a granddaughter of King George V and Queen Mary and a cousin of Queen Elizabeth II, at Westminster Abbey in London. The wedding ceremony was attended by all the members of the royal family and was broadcast worldwide on television, watched by an estimated 200 million people.

The Queen had offered Ogilvy an earldom on his wedding, which he declined. He also rejected a grace-and-favour apartment at one of the royal palaces. Instead, he leased Thatched House Lodge in Richmond, London from the Crown Estate for him and Princess Alexandra to live in, and where she still lives today. However, she retained an apartment at St James's Palace, which is customary for the royal family.

The couple had two children, James (born in 1964) and Marina (born in 1966).

Issue

Marina's first pregnancy, which was announced in late 1989, caused a controversy as the couple were not married. This resulted in a feud with her parents who suggested she either marry her companion or have an abortion. In an interview with a tabloid at the time, Marina had claimed that her parents had cut off her trust fund and monthly allowance due to their disapproval of her conduct.

Later years
After his business career was blighted, Ogilvy was involved with charity work. He served as president of the Imperial Cancer Research Fund and as chairman of Youth Clubs UK, the biggest non-uniformed youth organisation in Britain. He was patron of Arthritis Care, vice-patron of the National Children's Homes, chairman of the advisory council of The Prince's Trust, a trustee of the Leeds Castle Foundation, as well as being a member of the governing council of Business in the Community and of the Society for Promoting Christian Knowledge. He was also a member of the Royal Company of Archers, the Sovereign's Bodyguard in Scotland, in which his father had served as one of its four lieutenants.

He suffered from throat cancer in later years, and his last public appearance with his wife was when he accompanied her to Thailand for an official tour.

Ogilvy died in Kingston upon Thames, London, on 26 December 2004 after spending three months in hospital with cancer-related illnesses, including acute pneumonia. His funeral took place at St. George's Chapel, Windsor in Windsor Castle on 5 January 2005. He was buried in the Royal Burial Ground, Frogmore, at Windsor.

Legacy
Ogilvy and his wife attended a special service at St Anne's Church, Kew, on Sunday 10 May 1964, to mark the church's 250th anniversary. Two pew cushions in the church are embroidered with their names and coats of arms.

Honours and arms

 KCVO: Knight Commander of the Royal Victorian Order, 31 December 1988
 PC: Privy Counsellor, 31 December 1996

References

1928 births
2004 deaths
20th-century English businesspeople
Alumni of Trinity College, Oxford
Burials at the Royal Burial Ground, Frogmore
Deaths from cancer in England
Deaths from esophageal cancer
Knights Commander of the Royal Victorian Order
Members of the Privy Council of the United Kingdom
Members of the Royal Company of Archers
People educated at Eton College
People educated at Heatherdown School
Residents of Thatched House Lodge
Scots Guards officers
Younger sons of earls